Evansville is the third largest city in the U.S. state of Indiana.

Evansville may refer to:

Places 
United States
Evansville, Alaska
Evansville, Arkansas
Evansville, Indiana
Evansville, Illinois
Evansville Precinct, Randolph County, Illinois
Evansville, Minnesota
Evansville Township, Douglas County, Minnesota
Evansville, Missouri
Evansville, Wisconsin
Evansville, Wyoming

Canada
Evansville, Ontario (disambiguation), multiple places

Sports teams
Evansville BlueCats, professional indoor football team
Evansville Crimson Giants, one of several defunct NFL teams
Evansville Otters, minor league baseball team

Other uses
Evansville Regional Airport, near Evansville, Indiana
University of Evansville

See also
Evinsville, South Carolina